On April 21, 2020, the line-up for the first four concerts in the series were announced, with the each show to be headlined – in chronological order – by the boy groups SuperM, WayV, NCT Dream, and NCT 127. Media outlets have associated the concerts' timing for NCT subunits NCT Dream and NCT 127 with their album release schedules.

In May 2020, SM Entertainment announced two additional concert dates were added for the month of May, bringing the number of shows to six. It was also revealed that they would be headlined by veteran K-pop acts, TVXQ and Super Junior respectively.

Concerts

April 26, 2020: SuperM – Beyond the Future 
On April 26, 2020, SuperM was the first boy group from SM Entertainment to perform online the full-sized live concert, a follow-up to their prior sold-out tour in North America as well as an alternative to their indefinitely postponed Japan Tokyo Dome concert due to the COVID-19 pandemic. Live from Seoul, South Korea, they performed songs from their self-titled debut EP including the title track "Jopping". As part of the concert, SuperM premiered a new track titled "Tiger Inside", revealing their plan for a future comeback in addition to playing a highlight medley of tracks from their upcoming album release. In total, they performed 18 songs including solo, unit and group performances as SuperM and their own regular projects. The concert lasted two hours, with a turnout of over 75,000 paid live viewers from 109 countries. SM Entertainment girl group Red Velvet members made a surprise appearance in the concert as video called-in audience. Selected audience to ask questions via video chats came from locations abroad, including the U.S., Japan, New Zealand and Thailand.

With average ticket price at $US 30, the estimated gross revenue of the concerts from virtual tickets is over $US 2 million.

Technological features for the concerts received widespread attention among entertainment media. Variety magazine remarked that the live show experienced minor lag issues but overall delivered, pointing out that certain features of the concerts cannot be achieved or witnessed at an in-person concert, giving example of a scene in which tigers jumped across the stage during the performance of new track "Tiger Inside". ABC News shared similar observations, commending the technology-created Tigers that were viable only in a virtual concert setting, in addition highlighting the real-time interaction features, with the audience able to write down messages to the online chat which can be read by the group members, as well as selected viewers given opportunity to ask questions through live video calls. The Hankyoreh described how the stage for "Jopping" transformed into the Colosseum-like structure in which the group members danced on the "circular stadium", giving the members an impression "like gladiators in ancient Rome". The live sync camera filming, with which space is linked with camera walking, is also regarded as a factor contributing to building a more realistic experience for viewers. Internet connection issues during the Q&A sessions with audience however have been noted by media as an area for improvement, with ABC News observing that during the video call session with audience located at different locations abroad, "brief moments of stutters" were experienced as a result of internet connection issues from audience's sites. That said, the opportunity for direct interactions between the boy group and their international fans received warm approval from the press.

Set list

May 3, 2020: WayV – Beyond the Vision 
On May 3, 2020, WayV was the second boy group to perform online for the Beyond Live series. This was also WayV's first online concert. The group performed songs from their mini albums as well as a new song titled "Turn Back Time". The surprise guest was Super Junior's Shindong.

During the concert, a new feature was introduced called "official light stick sync play", which is an interactive activity displaying the ability to change the color of the fans' light stick in sync with the live performances. As a multilingual group, WayV communicated with fans using Korean, Chinese, Thai, English, and Japanese.

3 of the songs – "Lovely", "Face to Face" and "Come Back" were excluded from the VOD Service due to copyright issues.

Set list

May 10, 2020: NCT Dream – Beyond the Dream Show 
On May 10, 2020, NCT Dream held their first online concert after the release of their fourth Korean EP Reload on April 29, front lining the third installment of the Beyond Live series. NCT members Mark, Doyoung and Jungwoo made an appearance as video-call guest who gave challenges to the group and the online audience.

2 of the songs "We Go Up" and "Best Friend" were excluded from the VOD Service due to copyright issues.

Set list

May 17, 2020: NCT 127 – Beyond the Origin 
On May 17, 2020, NCT 127 held their concert in the fourth installment of the Beyond Live series, performing songs in English, Korean and Japanese. Over 104,000 paid viewers from 129 countries watched the concert in real time, resulting in concert revenue of over 4 billion won. In the concert, NCT 127 performed the first stage performance of their song Boom from their latest album Neo Zone as well as new tracks from their upcoming repackaged album to be released two days after the concert, including the premier stage of Punch. According to Billboard, the scene of a 3-D dragon flying around the stage during Kick It performance was one of the technical highlights of the concert. In addition, the effects of the LED screens surrounding the stage during the performance of "Highway to Heaven" received praise from Billboard for giving the impression that the group was dancing on the surface of "an actual highway surrounded by shots of a West Coast desert", with viewer experience amplified through over-head combined with side-angled views. Reviewing the tech-provided interaction experience, Insider remarked that the cheers from audience were loud enough that the group had to ask to reduce the volume.

The new technical feature introduced in this concert was the multi-camera stream which gave viewers the option to select individual view shot of a particular member, besides the normal full group camera focus.

During the concert, NCT 127 answered questions via video with fans calling in from South Korea, Japan and the U.S. The surprise artist guest who called in via video was Yunho from TVXQ.

3 of the songs "Cherry Bomb", "Boom" and "Baby Don't Like It" were excluded from the VOD Service due to copyright issues.

Set list

May 24, 2020: TVXQ – Beyond the T 
TVXQ held their concert on May 24, coinciding with the 15th anniversary of their Japanese debut. They performed 14 songs in the concert, ranging from their Korean songs, Japanese songs to their solo works. The concert was praised for its high quality of augmented reality effects, notably the helicopter appearance during "Why? (Keep Your Head Down)", haze in "Rising Sun" and swimming whale during "Asu Wa Suru Kara" performances. No Cut News stated that the multicamera feature that was introduced during NCT127's concert is more widely used in the concert. However, there are problems during interactive corner with the audiences in which their voices could not be heard clearly. After the concert end, the hashtag #TVXQ_BeyondLIVE trended on twitter in multiple countries; Thailand, Philippines, Indonesia, Chile, Peru and Singapore. Jeno, Jaemin, and Jisung from NCT Dream were the surprise guests in the concert.

Set list

May 31, 2020: Super Junior – Beyond the Super Show 
Super Junior's concert was directed by a member of the band, Eunhyuk who had previously directed their concert tours, Super Show 7 and Super Show 8. The concert, aptly named "Beyond the Super Show", ran for 130 minutes with the band performing 16 songs. Changmin from TVXQ was the special guest in the concert. This was Super Junior's first concert after the cancellation of several Super Show 8 concerts in 2020 in Japan and other countries due to the impact of the COVID-19 pandemic, and was organized as part of a project of activities in 2020 to celebrate 15 years since the debut of the group. The live concert was held on May 31 and Super Junior played live to an audience of over 123,000 around the world. The concert revenue was estimated to be over 6 billion won. During the concert, Super Junior played songs by the group and its sub-units. The concert also marked the first stage performance of "Home", the new unreleased track by sub-unit Super Junior K.R.Y from their first Korean album since debut of the sub-unit in 2006, which was released on June 8, 2020.

Set list

August 9, 2020: Twice – World in a Day

August 23, 2020: Super Junior-K.R.Y. – The Moment With Us 
On July 30, Super Junior-K.R.Y., a subunit of the boyband Super Junior announced that they would hold an online concert on August 23. They had previously appeared on the "Beyond The Super Show" concert held by Super Junior on May 31, and sang the song "Home".

Due to music copyright issues, starting from 12pm on 20 November 2020 (Fri)(KST), One of the songs "Sky" is unavoidably excluded from the VOD Service.

Set list

August 29, 2020: a-nation online 2020

Set lists

November 22, 2020: Stray Kids – Unlock: Go Live In Life

November 27, 2020: 2020 K-Pop x K-Art Concert Super KPA

Set list

December 27, 2020: NCT – Resonance: Global Wave 
On December 12, NCT announced that they would hold an online virtual concert titled NCT: RESONANCE 'Global Wave'. The concert was held on December 27 and watched by over 200,000 live audience from 124 countries. Twitter hashtags related to the event also trended No. 1 real-time in 23 countries. NCT performed a total of 21 songs from their debut to the latest single Resonance; performances were delivered by their fixed units as well as different combinations of members.

One of the songs "The 7th Sense" was excluded from VOD Service due to copyright issues.

Set list

January 1, 2021: SMTOWN LIVE "Culture Humanity" 

On December 27, SM Entertainment announced that SMTOWN would hold a free online concert (Kangta, TVXQ, Super Junior, Girls Generation's Taeyeon, Shinee's Taemin, EXO's Baekhyun and Kai, Red Velvet, NCT U, NCT 127, NCT Dream, WayV, SuperM & Aespa).

January 3, 2021: Baekhyun – Light 
On December 21, Baekhyun of Exo announced that he would hold an online virtual concert, which served as his first solo concert. The concert is named after Baekhyun's "superpower" of light in Exo. The setlist spanned several of his solo songs, b-sides, and soundtrack songs, as well as songs from his group Exo and sub-unit Exo-CBX. He premiered "Addicted" and "Get You Alone" from his upcoming self-titled Japanese debut EP, with the latter serving as the album's lead single; the music video premiered as a surprise for fans before the concert's encore.

2 of the songs – "Young" and "Every Second" were excluded from VOD Service due to copyright issues.

Set list 
{{hidden|headercss=background: #ccccff; font-size: 100%; width: 75%;|contentcss=text-align: left; font-size: 100%; width: 75%;|header=January 3, 2021 Baekhyun: Light|content=
Below is a setlist showing performances by Baekhyun in the concert.

 "Young"
 "Trouble"
 "Ghost"
 "Underwater"
 "R U Ridin'?"
 "UN Village"
 "Every Second"
 "What I Want for Christmas"
 "My Answer"
 "Amusement Park"
 "Love Again"
 "Addicted"
 "Get You Alone"
 "Ice Queen"
 "Call Me Baby"
 "Growl"
 "Blooming Day"
 "Psycho"
 "Ringa Ringa Ring"
 "Poppin'"
 "Candy"

Encore
 "Garden in the Air"
 "Cherish"
}}

April 4, 2021: SHINee – SHINee World 
On March 12, Shinee officially announced their plans to hold their very first online concert. Entitled "Shinee: Shinee World," the concert took place on April 4 at 3 p.m. KST through "Beyond LIVE", the new online performance platform launched by SM Entertainment and Naver last year.

Set list

May 2, 2021: Taemin – N.G.D.A. (Never Gonna Dance Again) 
On April 19, SM Entertainment announced that Taemin of SHINee would hold his first online concert. Entitled "TAEMIN : N.G.D.A."（Never Gonna Dance Again） the concert took place on May 2 at 3 p.m. KST through "Beyond LIVE", his last solo concert before enlistment.

Set list 
{{hidden|headercss=background: #ccccff; font-size: 100%; width: 75%;|contentcss=text-align: left; font-size: 100%; width: 75%;|header=May 2, 2021: Taemin: N.G.D.A|content=
Below is a setlist showing performances by Taemin in the concert.

"Think of You"
"I Think It's Love
"Guess Who + "Sexuality"
"Criminal"
"Idea"
"Heaven"
"Door" (Korean version)
"Move"
"Goodbye" (Korean version)
"Shadow"
"Want"
"Drip Drop"
"Advice"
"Pinocchio"
"Black Rose"
"Danger"
"Soldier" + "Rise"

Encore (Surprise Live)
"I'm Crying" (Korean version)
"Snow Flower"
}}

July 25, 2021: Super Junior Yesung Special Event: "I'll Light Your Way" 
On July 16, SM Entertainment announced SUPER JUNIOR's Yesung to hold Japan Online Special Event.

Set list

August 8, 2021: Day6 (Even of Day) – Right Through Me 
On July 14, JYP Entertainment announced that Day6 (Even of Day), the sub-unit of Day6, would hold their first online concert. They are the first rock act to hold a Beyond Live concert. The concert took place on August 8 to support their second extended play, Right Through Me.

Set list

September 26, 2021: Key: Groks in the Keyland 
On August 31, Shinee's Key announced his first online concert, entitled "Groks in the Keyland".

Set list

November 6, 7, 8, 2021: 2021 Musical "Marie Antoinette" Live 
On October 22, EMK announced the ticket open for 2021 Musical "Marie Antoinette" with special guest - NCT's Doyoung on November 6, 7, 8, 2021 via V Live.

December 12, 2021 (#Cinema): Kai: KLoor 
On November 22, 2021, Exo's Kai announced his first-ever solo concert to support his second mini album "Peaches".

3 of the songs - "Amnesia", "I See You" and "Jekyll" were excluded from the VOD Service due to copyright issues.

Set list

December 19, 2021: NCT 127 2nd Tour 'Neo City: Seoul – The Link'

December 26, 2021: Twice 4th World Tour 'III': Seoul

January 1, 2022: SMTOWN LIVE 2022: SMCU EXPRESS @ KWANGYA 

On December 10, 2021, SM Entertainment announced that it would be releasing a winter album titled 2021 Winter SM Town: SMCU Express. In the same announcement, it was also announced that a free-to-watch live online concert would be held on January 1, 2022 (Kangta, BoA, TVXQ, Super Junior, Girls Generation's Taeyeon and Hyoyeon, Shinee's Onew, Key and Minho, Exo's Kai, Red Velvet, NCT U, NCT 127, NCT Dream, WayV, Aespa & the newly formed female supergroup Got The Beat).

February 6, 2022: Super Junior Kyuhyun Special Event: "Lover's Concerto" 
On December 24, 2021, Super Junior announced on their Japanese website Kyuhyun would hold his first online concert.

Set list

March 13 and 27, 2022: Wonpil Solo Concert "Pilmography" 
On January 25, Day6 announced Wonpil's schedule for his solo debut studio album "Pilmography", which was released on February 7, and also announced his first solo concert on March 11–13 to commemorate his album. On February 12, it was announced that the third show at Yes24 Live Hall (March 13) would be live-streamed via Beyond LIVE.

On February 28, Day6 announced Wonpil's two additional performances before his enlistment on March 28 – March 26 and 27. The second show at Kwangwoon University (March 27) was live-streamed via Beyond LIVE.

April 3, 2022: Cravity The 1st Concert "Center of Gravity" 
On March 2, Starship Entertainment announced Cravity's 1st concert to be held on April 2 and 3 offline, and on April 3 online.

Set list

April 5, 2022: NCT Dream "Dream Stage: Glitch Mode" 
On March 7, SM Entertainment announced NCT Dream would hold their second online concert titled "Dream Stage: Glitch Mode" to commemorate their second studio album Glitch Mode.

May 1, 2022: Stray Kids 2nd World Tour "Maniac" in Seoul

May 28, 2022: NCT 127 2nd Tour 'Neo City: Japan – The Link'

June 12, 2022: 2022 WJSN Concert "Wonderland" 
On May 6, Starship Entertainment announced WJSN to hold their first solo concert in 3 years since their last concert "Would You Stay: Secret Box" held in 2019.

{{hidden|headercss=background: #ccccff; font-size: 100%; width: 75%;
|contentcss=text-align: left; font-size: 100%; width: 75%;
|header=June 12, 2022: 2022 WJSN Concert "Wonderland"
|content=
Below is a setlist showing performances by WJSN in the concert.
 "La La Love"
 "Full Moon"
 "Save Me, Save You" (Rearranged ver.)
 "New Me"
 "Tra-La"
 "Miracle"
 "Secret"
 "Stronger" (Dawon & Yeonjung)
 "Easy" (WJSN THE BLACK)
 "Hmph!" + "Super Yuppers!" (WJSN CHOCOME)
 "Babyface"
 "Don't Touch"
 "Hurry Up"
 "Badaboom"
 "Aura" (OT10 ver.)
 "You & I"
 "As You Wish"
 "Dreams Come True"
 "Happy"
 "Boogie Up"
 "Unnatural"

Encore
  "Memories"
 "Geeminy"
}}

July 17, 2022: Super Junior World Tour 'Super Show 9: Road'

July 23, 2022: HKT48 Live Tour 2022 "Under the Spotlight" (2 shows) 
On July 7, HKT48 announced that the final 2 shows at Fukuoka would be live-streamed via Beyond LIVE. They are the first Japanese group to hold a concert on the streaming service.

{{hidden
|headercss=background: #ccccff; font-size: 100%; width: 75%;
|contentcss=text-align: left; font-size: 100%; width: 75%;
|header=July 23, 2022: HKT48 Live Tour 2022 "Under the Spotlight"
|content=
Below is a setlist showing performances by HKT48 in the noon and evening concerts.
"Make noise" (Noon) / "Tomaranai Kansansha" (Evening)
"Totsuzen Do love me!"
"Ishi"
"74okubun no 1 no Kimi e"
"Tasogare no Tandem"
"Natsu no Mae"
"SNS WORLD"
"Soramimi Rock"
"Akkenai Konayuki"
"HAKATA Kyuuketsuki"
"Zenzen Kawaranai"
"Idol no Ouja"
"Hitsuzenteki Koibito"
"Buddy"
"Already"
"2018nen no Hashi"
"Get you!"
"3-2"
"Kimi to Doko ka e Ikitai"
"Juubun, Shiawase"
"Himawari no Suisaiga"
"Kanashimi no Jouka Souchi"
"Biisan wa Naze Naku Naru no ka?"
"12byou"
"Hatsukoi Butterfly"
"Kimi no Koto ga Suki yaken"
"Shekarashika!"
"Wink wa Sankai"
"Suki! Suki! Skip!"
"Melon Juice"
"Buttaoreru Made"
"Oshaberi Jukebox"
"Saikou ka yo"
"Sakura, Minna de Tabeta"
"Otona Ressha"

Encore
"Rock da yo, Jinsei wa..."
"Hayaokuri Calendar"
"Totsuzen Do love me!"
"Ima, Kimi wa Omou" (Evening)
"HKT Family" (Evening)
}}

July 27, 2022: Stray Kids 2nd World Tour "MANIAC" in Japan

August 7, 2022: Itzy The 1st World Tour "Checkmate"

August 20, 2022: SMTOWN Live 2022: SMCU Express@Human City Suwon

August 28, 2022: SMTOWN Live 2022: SMCU Express@Tokyo

September 4, 2022: 2022 Monsta X "No Limit" Tour in Seoul

September 9, 2022: NCT Dream Tour "The Dream Show 2: In a Dream" 

{{hidden
|headercss=background: #ccccff; font-size: 100%; width: 75%;
|contentcss=text-align: left; font-size: 100%; width: 75%;
|header=September 9, 2022: NCT Dream Tour "The Dream Show 2: In a Dream"
|content=
Below is a setlist showing performances by NCT Dream in the concert.
 "Glitch Mode"
 "Countdown (3, 2, 1)"
 "Stronger"
 "Dreaming"
 "Deja Vu"
 "My First and Last"
 "Bye My First..."
 "Love Again"
 "To My First"
 "Sorry, Heart"
 "Puzzle Piece"
 "Chewing Gum"
 "ANL"
 "Dive Into You"
 "Irreplaceable"
 "Saturday Drip"
 "Quiet Down"
 "Better Than Gold"
 "Life is Still Going On"
 "Diggity"
 "Fire Alarm"
 "Ridin'"
 "Go"
 "Boom"
 "Hello Future"
 "We Go Up"
 "Trigger the Fever"
 "Hot Sauce"

Encore
  "Beatbox"
 "My Youth"
 "Dear Dream"
 "Rainbow" 
 "Walk You Home"
}}

September 16, 2022: NCT 127 4th Album "2 Baddies" Comeback Show - Faster 
On September 2, NCT 127 announced their comeback show to commemorate their fourth studio album "2 Baddies".

October 23, 2022: Key Concert - G.O.A.T. (Greatest Of All Time) In The Keyland 
On September 5, Key announced his first offline concert in 3 years and 8 months to be held in Seoul and Japan.

{{hidden
|headercss=background: #ccccff; font-size: 100%; width: 75%;
|contentcss=text-align: left; font-size: 100%; width: 75%;
|header=October 23, 2022: Key Concert - G.O.A.T. (Greatest Of All Time) In The Keyland
|content=
Below is a setlist showing performances by Key in the concert.
 "Gasoline"
 "Guilty Pleasure"
 "Another Life"
 "Yellow Tape"
 "Villain" (Rearranged ver.)
 "Show Me"
 "Hologram"
 "Saturday Night"
 "Proud"
 "Delight"
 "Forever Yours"
 "I Wanna Be"
 "One of Those Nights" (Acoustic ver.)
 "I Can't Sleep"
 "Imagine"
 "Bound"
 "Helium"
 "Ain't Gonna Dance"
 "Eighteen (End of My World)"
 "Burn"
 "Chemicals"
 "This Life"

Encore
  "Bad Love" (Extended ver.)
 "G.O.A.T. (Greatest Of All Time)"
}}

October 23, 2022: NCT 127 2nd Tour 'Neo City: Seoul – The Link+'

November 27, 2022: NCT Dream Tour "The Dream Show 2: In a Dream - in Japan" 

{{hidden
|headercss=background: #ccccff; font-size: 100%; width: 75%;
|contentcss=text-align: left; font-size: 100%; width: 75%;
|header=November 27, 2022: NCT Dream Tour "The Dream Show 2: In a Dream - in Japan"
|content=
Below is a setlist showing performances by NCT Dream in the concert.
 "Glitch Mode" (Japanese ver.)
 "Countdown (3, 2, 1)"
 "Stronger"
 "Dreaming"
 "Deja Vu"
 "My First and Last"
 "Bye My First..."
 "Love Again"
 "To My First"
 "Sorry, Heart"
 "Puzzle Piece"
 "Chewing Gum"
 "ANL"
 "Dive Into You"
 "Irreplaceable"
 "Saturday Drip"
 "Quiet Down"
 "Better Than Gold"
 "Life is Still Going On"
 "Diggity"
 "Ridin'"
 "Boom"
 "Hello Future"
 "We Go Up"
 "Trigger the Fever"
 "Hot Sauce"

Encore
  "Beatbox"
 "Candle Light"
 "My Youth"
 "Walk You Home"
}}

December 18, 2022: NiziU Live With U 2022 "Burn It Up" 
On November 30, 2022, NiziU announced that the final show in Osaka will be live-streamed via Beyond LIVE.

December 18, 2022: Xdinary Heroes Stage ♭: Overture 
On October 18, JYP Entertainment announced the schedule for Xdinary Heroes' second mini album Overload and it was announced that they will hold their first concert for three days.

On November 17, it was announced that the third show (December 18) will be live-streamed via Beyond LIVE.

{{hidden
|headercss=background: #ccccff; font-size: 100%; width: 75%;
|contentcss=text-align: left; font-size: 100%; width: 75%;
|header=December 18, 2022: Xdinary Heroes Stage ♭: Overture
|content=
Below is a setlist showing performances by Xdinary Heroes in the concert.
 "Test Me"
 "Sucker Punch!"
 "Lunatic"
 "Zzz..."
 "Pirates"
 "Strawberry Cake"
 "Love Me Right" (cover)
 "Tomboy" (cover)
 "Hellevator" (cover)
 "Zombie" (cover)
 "Imposible" (cover)
 "Ghost of You" (cover)
 "Drown" (cover)
 "Origin of Xdinary Heroes" (Solo members)
 "Hair Cut"
 "Crack in the Mirror"
 "Ghost"
 "Knock Down"
 "X-Mas"
 "Happy Death Day"
 "Stay" (Gaon & Jooyeon cover)
 "Phantom Razor" (Jun Han & Gunil cover)
 "Butter" (O.de & Jungsu cover)

Encore
  "You're the One" (cover)
 "Jingle Bell Rock" (cover)
 "Happy Death Day"
 "X-Mas"
 "Test Me"
}}

January 1, 2023: SM Town Live 2023: SMCU Palace@Kwangya

February 19, 2023: NCT Dream Tour "The Dream Show 2: In a Dream - in Japan" 

{{hidden
|headercss=background: #ccccff; font-size: 100%; width: 75%;
|contentcss=text-align: left; font-size: 100%; width: 75%;
|header=February 19, 2023: NCT Dream Tour "The Dream Show 2: In a Dream - in Japan"
|content=
Below is a setlist showing performances by NCT Dream in the concert.
 "Glitch Mode" (Japanese ver.)
 "Countdown (3, 2, 1)"
 "Stronger"
 "Dreaming"
 "Deja Vu"
 "My First and Last"
 "Bye My First..."
 "Love Again"
 "To My First"
 "Sorry, Heart"
 "Puzzle Piece"
 "Chewing Gum"
 "ANL"
 "Dive Into You"
 "Irreplaceable"
 "Saturday Drip"
 "Quiet Down"
 "Better Than Gold"
 "Life is Still Going On"
 "Diggity"
 "Ridin'"
 "Fire Alarm"
 "Boom"
 "Hello Future"
 "Best Friend Ever"
 "Trigger the Fever"
 "Hot Sauce"

Encore
  "Beatbox"
 "Candle Light"
 "Dear Dream"
 "Walk You Home"
 "Candy"
}}

February 23, 2023: Itzy The 1st World Tour "Checkmate" in Japan

February 25, 2023: Stray Kids 2nd World Tour "Maniac" Encore in Japan

February 26, 2023: 2023 aespa 1st Concert "Synk: Hyper Line"

March 5, 2023: Onew 1st Concert "O-New-Note"

Fanmeetings

November 7, 2020: Super Junior – 15th Anniversary Special Event: Invitation 
Super Junior held a special event, Invitation, on November 7 through Beyond Live to commemorate their 15th anniversary as a group.

One of the songs "U" was excluded from the VOD service due to copyright issues.

Set list

December 26, 2020: 2020 TVXQ Online Fanmeeting: Cassiopeia 
On December 11, TVXQ announced they would hold an online fanmeeting, named "Cassiopeia" to celebrate their 17th anniversary.

Set list

March 27, 2021: Xiumin Online Fanmeeting – On: Xiuweet Time 
On March 5, SM Entertainment announced that Xiumin of Exo would hold an online fanmeeting to celebrate his 31st birthday.

Set list

April 25, 2021: Super Junior-E.L.F Japan 10th Anniversary – The SUPER Blue Party 
On July 2, 2021, Super Junior announced that they would release the fanmeeting on Blu-ray and DVD on September 1, 2021.

Set list

May 23, 2021: SHINee World J Presents – Bistro de SHINee 
On September 10, 2021, SHINee announced that they would release the fanmeeting on Blu-ray and DVD on November 24, 2021.

Set list

July 7, 2021: NCT 127 ONLINE FANMEETING 'OFFICE: Foundation Day' 
On June 29, SM Entertainment announced NCT 127 would hold an online fanmeeting to celebrate the 5th anniversary of their debut.

Set list

August 16, 2021: Red Velvet ONLINE FANMEETING – inteRView vol.7: Queendom 
On August 1, Red Velvet announced their sixth EP "Queendom" would be released on August 16 and their online fanmeeting on the same date to celebrate their new album and their 7th debut anniversary.

Set list

August 25, 2021: NCT Dream ONLINE FANMEETING 'HOT! SUMMER DREAM' 
On August 13, SM Entertainment announced NCT Dream would hold online fanmeeting to celebrate their 5th debut anniversary.

Set list

September 4, 2021: 2PM 13th Anniversary ONLINE FANMEETING "Dear. HOTTEST" 
On August 13, JYP Entertainment announced 2PM would hold an online fanmeeting to celebrate their 13th debut anniversary.

Set list

November 14, 2021: TVXQ Bigeast FANCLUB EVENT 2021 TOHOSHINKI The GARDEN ~Online~ 
On October 15, 2021. TVXQ announced from their Japanese official website that they would hold an online fanmeeting, titled "Bigeast FANCLUB EVENT 2021 TOHOSHINKI The GARDEN~Online~", This event is recreation of "TOHOSHINKI THE GARDEN", the TVXQ's fan club event held in 2019 .

Set list

December 21, 2021: Choi Minho Fan Party "Best Choi's Minho 2021" 
On November 24, SHINee's Minho announced his solo fan meeting to be held offline and online on December 21 for the first time in 2 years, following his "The Best Choi's Minho" fan meeting event held back in March 2019.

Set list

January 23, 2022: 2022 Lee Junho Fanmeeting "Junho the Moment" 
On January 3, 2PM announced Junho would hold his fanmeeting on January 22 and 23 offline and on January 23 online to celebrate his birthday.

Set list

February 13, 2022: Stray Kids 2nd #LoveSTAY "SKZ's Chocolate Factory" 
On January 7, Stray Kids announced their second fanmeeting to be held on February 12 and 13 offline and on February 13 online.

April 9, 2022: Itzy The 1st Fan Meeting "ITZY, MIDZY, Let's Fly!" 
On January 1, Itzy announced their first fanmeeting to be held on February 19 offline and online.

On February 13, JYP Entertainment announced the postponement of the fanmeeting due to Lia's positive PCR test for COVID-19. It was postponed for April 9.

April 9, 2022: EXO 2022 Debut Anniversary Fan Event 
On March 17, SM Entertainment announced EXO's fan event to be held on April 9 offline and online to commemorate their 10th debut anniversary.

May 1, 2022: 2PM Jun.K & Wooyoung 2022 Fan-Con "115430" 
On April 5, JYP Entertainment announced 2PM's Jun.K & Wooyoung to hold their first fanmeeting on April 30 and May 1 offline, and on May 1 online. The label stated that the fan concert would be more like a fan meeting with performances from the artists like a small concert.

July 30, 2022: 2022 aespa Fan Meeting: My Synk. aespa 
On June 24, aespa announced their first fan meeting since their debut to be held offline and online.

August 14, 2022: Lee Junho 2022 Fan-Con "Before Midnight" 
On June 30, after opening his official Twitter, Lee Junho announced his fan-con in South Korea and Japan.

September 3, 2022: 2022 Girls' Generation Special Event "Long Lasting Love" 
On August 10, Girls' Generation announced their 2022 fanmeeting to commemorate their 15th debut anniversary.

October 15, 2022: Kim Go-eun Debut 10th Anniversary Fan Meeting "Go-eun Day: Come In Closer" 
On April 25, 2022, Kim Go-eun announced her offline fan meeting in the second half of this year. On September 19, 2022, it was announced that the fanmeeting will be live-streamed via Beyond LIVE.

December 3, 2022: 2022 The Boyz Fan Con：The B－Road 
On November 8, IST Entertainment announced that THE BOYZ will hold a fan concert for 2 days to commemorate their fifth debut anniversary.

December 8, 2022: 2022 Best Choi's Minho - Lucky Choi's 
On November 8, SHINee announced that Minho will hold his solo fan meeting for 2 days.

Set list

December 21, 2022: NCT Dream Winter Special Event "Candy" 
On December 9, NCT Dream announced their Winter Special Event to commemorate their first special mini album Candy.

Set list

January 8, 2023: 2023 WJSN Fan-Con "Codename: Ujung" 
On November 18, 2022, WJSN announced their fan concert to be held on January next year.

Set list

January 29, 2023: 2023 Park Jinyoung Fan Concert "Rendezvous in Seoul: Secret Meeting Between You And Me" 
On December 12, 2022, BH Entertainment announced Jinyoung's 2023 fan concert to be held in Seoul.

Set list

February 11, 2023: 2023 Im Si-wan Fan Concert "Why I Am in Seoul" 
On January 9, Plum Entertainment announced Im Siwan's first fan concert in Seoul.

Set list

February 11, 2023: 2023 WayV Fanmeeting Tour "Phantom" 
On January 10, 2023, WayV announced their second fanmeeting tour to commemorate their fourth mini album Phantom.

Set list

February 12, 2023: Ive The 1st Fan Concert "The Prom Queens"

Set list

February 12, 2023: Itzy The 2nd Fan Meeting "ITZY, MIDZY, Let's Fly! To Wonder World"

Set list

February 19, 2023: 2023 Cravity Fan-Con "Dear My Luvity"

Set list

Variety shows

Upcoming concerts and fanmeetings

See also

 Beyond Live

Notes

References

External links
 

South Korean entertainment websites